Joseph Matthew Gaydos (July 3, 1926 – February 7, 2015) was a Democratic member of the U.S. House of Representatives from Pennsylvania. Gaydos was the first Slovak American to serve in the United States Congress.

Early life and education
Gaydos was born in Braddock, Pennsylvania. His parents were called John and Elona Magella Gaydos and were born in Slovakia.

He attended Duquesne University and graduated from the University of Notre Dame Law School in 1951.

World War II
He served during World War II in the Pacific theater with the United States Navy Reserve, 1944–1946.

Political career
He served in the Pennsylvania State Senate from 1967 to 1968. He served as Deputy Attorney General of Pennsylvania, Assistant Solicitor of Allegheny County, and general counsel to United Mine Workers of America, district five. 

He was elected simultaneously as a Democrat to the 90th and to the 91st Congress, by special election, to fill the vacancy caused by the death of United States Representative Elmer Holland.

He prioritized workers’ rights and preservation of the domestic steel industry while in Congress. He was a strong supporter of organized labor and was a leading proponent of strengthening labor laws to provide health and pension benefits, as well as job safety protections, for employees.

He was not a candidate for renomination in 1992.

He died on February 7, 2015, aged 88.

References

Sources
; retrieved March 1, 2015
 

1926 births
2015 deaths
United States Navy personnel of World War II
American people of Hungarian descent
American people of Slovak descent
Duquesne University alumni
Military personnel from Pennsylvania
Pennsylvania lawyers
Democratic Party Pennsylvania state senators
People from Braddock, Pennsylvania
Democratic Party members of the United States House of Representatives from Pennsylvania
Politicians from Pittsburgh
United Mine Workers people
Notre Dame Law School alumni
20th-century American politicians
20th-century American lawyers
United States Navy reservists